Improviso Negro is an album by Brazilian samba-jazz group Sambalanço Trio released in 1965.

Reception

Writing for Allmusic, John Bush states that the album "showed them expanding their dynamic range over their early LPs, ranging from tender balladry to clattering bossa nova workouts."

Track listing
"Nana" (Mario Telles) – 2:41
"Reza" (Edú Lobo) – 5:05
"Estamos Aí" (Durval Ferreira) – 2:29
"Deus Brasileiro" (Marcos Valle) – 1:13
"Preciso Aprender a Ser Só" (Marcos Valle) – 3:26
"Cangaceiro" (Antonio Arruda) – 2:35
"Improviso Negro" (Humberto Clayber) – 2:43	
"Roda de Samba" (Lúcio Alves) – 2:27	
"Voce" (Ronaldo Bôscoli, Roberto Menescal) – 3:31
"Cançao Que Veio de Dentro Do Azul" – 4:44
"Samba de Verao" (Marcos Valle) – 2:44

Personnel
Cesar Camargo Mariano – piano
Humberto Clayber – bass
Airto Moreira – drums

References

1965 albums
Sambalanço Trio albums